Curtismill Green is a  biological Site of Special Scientific Interest between Epping and Brentwood in Essex. It is registered common land. A report by Essex County Council in 2007 stated that the site was in multiple ownership, and it was in poor condition.

The site is a relic of the ancient Forest of Waltham, of which Epping Forest is the largest surviving part. It is unimproved grassland and scrub with both damp and dry areas, with a number of uncommon species. Notable plant species in grassland areas include Orange Foxtail, Lesser Spearwort and Yellow Rattle. There are also a number of ponds.

There is public access to the site.

References 

Sites of Special Scientific Interest in Essex